Qods (also known as Shahr-e Qods, meaning "City of Qods"; formerly, Karaj, Qal‘eh Hasan, and Qal‘eh-ye Ḩasan Khān) is a city in the Central District of Qods County, Tehran province, Iran, and serves as capital of the county. At the 2006 census, its population was 229,354 in 60,331 households, when it was in the former Qods District of Shahriar County.

The following census in 2011 counted 283,517 people in 83,035 households, by which time the district had been separated from the county, Qods County was established, and the city of Qods became its capital. The latest census in 2016 showed a population of 309,609 people in 94,532 households. Before Qods officially became a municipality in 1989 it was named Qal‘eh Hasan. The city is named after Jerusalem, in Arabic spelling.

Higher education
The city has three universities: Islamic Azad University, Shahr-eQods Branch, University of Applied Science and Technology, Shahr-e-Qods Branch and Payam-e-Nour university.

Sport

The Persian Gulf Pro League team Paykan plays in the city at Shahre Qods Stadium.

References

External links
 Red Crescent - University of Shahryar & Shahr-e Qods

Qods County

Cities in Tehran Province

Populated places in Tehran Province

Populated places in Qods County